Pallavaram Flyover is a rail over bridge with Roundabout interchange in NH 45 Grand Southern Trunk Road in Pallavaram, Chennai, Tamil Nadu.

Pallavaram Flyover paved the way for Pallavaram - Thuraipakkam Radial Road. The Bridge is located over Ponds Company Signal in Pallavaram. The Flyover is constructed to connect Chennai Airport with Rajiv Gandhi Salai(OMR) and East Coast Road(ECR).

Reference 

Road interchanges in India
Bridges and flyovers in Chennai